Chalonda Deatrice Goodman (born September 29, 1990) is an American sprinter who specializes in the 100 meters and 200 metres. She participated in the 2007 World Youth Championships in Athletics, winning a silver in the 200 metres.

A native of Newnan, Georgia, Goodman attended Newnan High School, where she was a two-time All-USA track and field selection by USA Today. She now attends the University of Texas at Austin.

Her older brother, Demiko Goodman, is also a successful track athlete.

References

External links

DyeStat profile for Chalonda Goodman
Texas Longhorns bio

1990 births
Living people
People from Newnan, Georgia
Sportspeople from the Atlanta metropolitan area
American female sprinters
African-American female track and field athletes
Texas Longhorns women's track and field athletes
Track and field athletes from Georgia (U.S. state)
21st-century African-American sportspeople
21st-century African-American women